Minu (also Romanized as Mīnū; also known as Mīnū ‘Olyā) is a village in Keshvar Rural District, Papi District, Khorramabad County, Lorestan Province, Iran. At the 2006 census, its population was 63, in 12 families.

References 

Towns and villages in Khorramabad County